Nivea (stylized as NIVEA) is a German personal care brand that specializes in skin and body care. It is owned by the Hamburg-based company Beiersdorf Global AG.  
This was the origin of Eucerin brand. Nivea comes from the Latin adjective niveus, nivea, niveum, meaning "snow-white".

During the 1930s, Beiersdorf produced various products such as tanning oils, shaving creams, shampoo, facial cleanser, and toners.  In World War II, the trademark "NIVEA" was expropriated in many countries. After the war, Beiersdorf bought the rights back. During the 1980s, the NIVEA brand expanded into a wider global market.

History

Paul Carl Beiersdorf established Beiersdorf AG on 28 March 1882. Beiersdorf collaborated with dermatologist Paul Gerson Unna to produce gutta-percha plasters in his laboratory on the basis of his patent, laying the foundations for modern plaster technology. In 1890, pharmacist Oskar Troplowitz took over the company and collaborated with Unna, who recommended Isaac Lifschütz, inventor of the lanolin-based emulsifier Eucerit, which was patented in 1900. Nivea soap was released in 1906 and in 1911, its signature creme was introduced.

Timeline
 1900: Patent application for Eucerit, an emulsifying agent. Eucerit was the basis for Eucerin and, later on, for NIVEA Creme.
 1906: The first overseas branch was established in London.
 1909: Labello was launched on the market. It was the first lip care product in sliding tube packaging. The term Labello is derived from Latin for "beautiful lip" (labea = lip; bello = beautiful).
 1911: NIVEA Creme – the first stable water-in-oil emulsion – was introduced. The emulsifying agent Eucerit is made from lanolin, found in sheep's wool, and is the key to NIVEA Creme's unique properties.
 1918: The deaths of Oskar Troplowitz and his partner Otto Hanns Mankiewicz resulted in the formation of a formal company on June 1, 1922.

1920s 

 1922: Willy Jacobsohn took over as chairman of the executive board of the newly formed stock corporation. The first self-adhesive plaster was introduced under the name Hansaplast.
 1925: NIVEA is relaunched in a new packaging: a blue tin with a white logo.
 1928: Beiersdorf shares were listed on the Hamburg stock exchange for the first time. Over 20 production sites worldwide were already in operation.

Nazi period in Germany and aftermath 
 1933: Under pressure of National Socialist propaganda, the Jewish members of the executive board stepped down.  Willy Jacobsohn, the former chairman of the executive board, headed the foreign affiliates from Amsterdam until 1938.
 By adopting a policy of "honorable tactics", the Beiersdorf Executive Board, under the leadership of Carl Claussen, steered the company through the Nazi period. Although Beiersdorf retained its own business culture, it  still cooperated with the regime.
 1936: tesafilm, an innovative transparent adhesive film, was launched.
 1941: tesa was introduced as the umbrella brand for self-adhesive technology.
 During World War II, marketing manager Elly Heuss-Knapp distanced the brand from Nazi ideology. In 1949 her husband Theodor Heuss became first President of the Federal Republic of Germany.
 1945: At the end of the Second World War, most of the Hamburg production plants and administrative buildings in Hamburg were destroyed during bombing in WW2.
 1945–1949: Most of the affiliates and the international trademarks in almost all countries, in particular in the US, the UK and the Commonwealth, and France, are lost. The Beiersdorf company began to regain its trademarks again.

Rest of 20th century 

 1950: ph5 Eucerin was launched on the market. This innovative ointment focuses on the importance of the skin's own natural protective acid barrier in maintaining good skin health.
 1951: The first deodorizing soap was introduced under the name of 8x4. The brand was extended into a product family during the 1950s and 1960s.
 1955: Beiersdorf launched a protective hand cream on the market under the name of atrix.
 1963: NIVEA milk, liquid NIVEA Creme in the form of water-in-oil emulsion, was introduced "for all-over body care".
 1974: Beiersdorf diversified its business and introduced a divisional structure. At this time, the divisions are cosmed, medical, pharma and tesa.
 1982: Start of steady expansion of NIVEA as a brand for skin and body care through large number of subbrands with  international focus. Introduction of NIVEA Gesicht (face) in Germany, Austria and Switzerland.
 1989: Change of strategy: Start of the implementation of a strategic re-orientation process focusing on the core competencies of skin care, wound care and adhesive technology.
 1990: Acquisition of the Juvena brand, developed by the Divapharma pharmaceutical laboratory, founded in 1945 in Zurich.
 1991: Acquisition of the La Prairie brand, originated in the famous La Prairie clinic in Montreux, Switzerland.
 1992: Launch of NIVEA's Blue Harmony advertising campaign. It was placed the last time in 2005.
 1995: Acquisition of the Futuro brand. The company was founded in Ohio, USA in 1917 by Georg Jung, a German, and produced bandages right from the start. The "Futuro" brand with its black and yellow packaging was born in 1936.
 1999: The company's strategy is streamlined further to focus on a few strong consumer brands. Professional wound care and self-adhesive technology were given the opportunity to introduce their own organizational structures.

Twenty-first century 

 2001: The new strategy enabled tesa to become an independent affiliate. Tesa AG was formed as a wholly owned affiliate of Beiersdorf, enabling it to react more flexibly to consumers and industrial customers.

Professional wound care was spun off in line with the new strategy and contributed to a joint venture between Beiersdorf and Smith & Nephew. BSN medical, domiciled in Hamburg, was founded.
 2002: Florena became a wholly owned Beiersdorf subsidiary. The cooperation dates back to 1989, and was intensified following the reunification of Germany.
 2003: A new functional group organization focusing on the areas of brands, supply chain management, finance and human resources replaced the previous divisional organization
 2004: The new skin research center opened in Hamburg, underscoring the innovative strength of the globally successful Beiersdorf group.
 2008: NIVEA began to sponsor the Times Square New Year's Ball Drop starting with the December 31, 2008 event, along with Carson's Countdown on New Year's Eve with Carson Daly.
 2010: NIVEA launched its new product, NIVEA Happiness Sensation, featuring the song "Touch" by singer-songwriter Natasha Bedingfield in the commercial.
2011: NIVEA celebrates its "100 Years of Skincare" festivities featuring several performances by Barbadian singer and actress Rihanna. Rihanna's song "California King Bed" was featured as a part of the "100 Years of Skincare" commercial campaign.

Controversies
In 2011, NIVEA was fined $900,000 by the U.S. Federal Trade Commission for falsely claiming that consumers could slim down by regularly applying NIVEA My Silhouette! cream to their skin.  The same year, NIVEA published a world map on its website that omitted Israel; Simon Wiesenthal Center protests.

In June, 2019, marketing and media industry journal Ad Age reported on June 26, 2019, that FCB, Nivea's long-time ad agency, had ended its relationship with the company. Among the primary reasons cited was NIVEA's rejection of a proposed ad that featured two men's hands touching because, according to a NIVEA executive, "we don't do gay at NIVEA." Crain's Chicago Business reported that FCB had ended the relationship of more than a century. Noting that the breakup occurred at the end of Gay pride month, Crain's noted that FCB would be forgoing the management of NIVEA's $21.8 million U.S. advertising budget. It represented 1% of FCB's revenue globally.

See also

References

External links

 
 NIVEA's History

Beiersdorf brands
German brands
Personal care brands
Products introduced in 1911
Soap brands